Olga Pogrebnyak (born May 24, 1973 in Minsk) is a Belarusian sport shooter. She competed in rifle shooting events at the 1996 and 2000 Summer Olympics.

Olympic results

References

1973 births
Living people
Sportspeople from Minsk
ISSF rifle shooters
Belarusian female sport shooters
Shooters at the 1996 Summer Olympics
Shooters at the 2000 Summer Olympics
Olympic shooters of Belarus
20th-century Belarusian women